Rama Raya (died 23 January 1565 CE) was a statesman of the Vijayanagara Empire, the son-in-law of Emperor Krishna Deva Raya and the progenitor of the Aravidu dynasty of Vijayanagara Empire, the fourth and last dynasty of the empire.

As regent, he was the de facto ruler of the empire from 1542 to 1565, although legally the emperor during this period was Sadasiva Raya, who was merely a puppet ruler.

Rama Raya was killed at the Battle of Talikota, after which the Vijayanagara Empire got fragmented into several semi-independent principalities paying only nominal allegiance to the empire.

Early life and career
Rama Raya was born in a Telugu family. His mother was Abbaladevi, and she was the daughter of a chieftain in Nandyala. The Aravidu family of Rama Raya was native to South Andhra.

Rama Raya and his younger brother Tirumala Deva Raya were sons-in-law of the great Vijayanagara emperor Krishna Deva Raya. He is referred to as Aliya Rama Raya by Kannada people. The word "Aliya" means "son-in-law" in the Kannada language. Along with another brother Venkatadri, the Aravidu brothers rose to prominence during the rule of Krishna Deva Raya. Rama Raya was a successful army general, able administrator, and tactful diplomat who conducted many victorious campaigns during the rule of Krishnadevaraya.

After the demise of his illustrious father-in-law, as a member of the family, Rama Raya, began to wield great influence over the affairs of the state. In particular, Rama Raya rose to power following a civil war with the help of Pemmasani Erra Timmanayudu of the Pemmasani Nayaks. Krishna Deva Raya was succeeded in 1529 by his younger brother Achyuta Deva Raya, upon whose demise in 1542, the throne devolved upon his nephew Sadashiva Raya, then a minor. Rama Raya appointed himself regent during the minority of Sadashiva Raya. After Sadashiva Raya came of age to rule, Rama Raya kept him a virtual prisoner.

During this time, he became the virtual ruler, having confined Sadashiva Raya. Rama Raya removed many loyal servants of the kingdom and replaced them with officers who were loyal to him. He also appointed two Muslim commanders, the Gilani brothers who were earlier in the service of the Sultan Adil Shah as commanders in his army, a mistake that would cost the empire the final Battle of Talikota. Rama Raya lacked royal blood of his own and to legitimize his rule he claimed vicarious connection with two of the most powerful Empires of medieval India, the Western Chalukya Empire and the Chola empire.

Sultanate affairs
During his rule, the Deccan Sultanates were constantly involved in internal fights and requested Rama Raya on more than one occasion to act as a mediator, enabling Rama Raya to push north of the Krishna river and expand his domains utilizing the disunity of the Deccan Sultans. Rama Raya had a lot of money at his disposal, which he generously spent, and often sought strategic alliances with Deccani sultans, who he had intentionally kept divided. He also suppressed revolts of the chieftains of Travancore and Chandragiri. Some scholars have criticised Rama Raya for interfering in the affairs of the Sultans too much, but scholars like Dr. P.B. Desai have ably defended his political affairs, indicating that Rama Raya did whatever he could to increase the prestige and importance of the Vijayanagar empire, ensuring no single Sultanate would rise above the others in power, hence preventing a difficult situation for Vijayanagar empire. In fact Rama Raya had interfered in Sultanate affairs only upon the insistence of one Sultan or the other, just the way the Sultans had acted as parleys between Rama Raya and Achyuta Raya in earlier years. When the Nizam of Ahmednagar and Qutbshah of Golconda sought Rama Raya's help against Bijapur, Rama Raya secured the Raichur doab for his benefactors. Later in 1549 when the Adilshah of Bijapur and Baridshah of Bidar declared war on Nizamshah of Ahmednagar, Ramaraya fought on behalf of the Ahamednagar ruler and secured the fort of Kalyana. In 1557 Ramaraya allied himself with Ali Adilshah of Bijapur and Baridshah of Bidar when the Sultan of Bijapur invaded Ahmednagar. The combined armies of the three kingdoms defeated the partnership between Nizamshah of Ahmednagar and the Qutbshah of Golconda.

The Vijayanagar ruler's constantly changing sides to improve his own position eventually prompted the Sultanates to form an alliance. Intermarriage between Sultanate families helped resolve internal differences between Muslim rulers.  The Battle of Talikota resulted from this consolidation of Muslim power in the northern Deccan, who had felt insulted by Ramaraya and formed a 'general league of the faithful.'

Battle of Talikota

Rama Raya remained loyal to the legitimate dynasty until it was finally extinguished by war, with the notable exception of imprisoning the appointed ruler Sadashiva Raya and ruling in his stead. In 1565, it was Rama Raya, as the pre-eminent general of the Vijayanagar army, who led the defense against the invading army of Deccan Sultans (i.e. Husain Nizam Shah, Ali Adil Shah and Ibrahim Qutb Shah) in the battle of Talikota.

This battle, which had seemed an easy victory for the large Vijayanagar army, instead became a disaster as two Muslim commanders (Gilani brothers) of the Vijayanagara army betrayed and switched sides and turned their loyalty to the united Sultanates during critical point of battle. It led to the surprise capture and death by beheading of Rama Raya who led the army, a blow from which it never recovered. Rama Raya was beheaded by Hussain Nizam Shah of Ahmadnagar, the Indian Muslim of Deccani origin. His severed head was on display at Ahmednagar at the anniversary of the battle of Talikota and would be covered in oil and red pigment by the descendant of his executioner.

The city of Vijayanagara was thoroughly sacked by the invaders and the inhabitants were massacred. The royal family was largely exterminated. Vijayanagara, once a city of fabled splendour, the seat of a vast empire, became a desolate ruin, now known by the name of a sacred inner suburb within it, Hampi.

References

 Dr. Suryanath U. Kamat, Concise History of Karnataka, 2001, MCC, Bangalore (Reprinted 2002)

1565 deaths
16th-century Indian monarchs
People of the Vijayanagara Empire
People from Bijapur district, Karnataka
History of Karnataka
Indian Hindus
Year of birth uncertain